Carrizalillo is a caldera in Chile. It is located in the Central Volcanic Zone and is part of the Paleocene-Eocene volcanic belt. It is heavily eroded. Active during the Cretaceous, it is a large caldera. Post-collapse activity generated subsidiary calderas inside the older main caldera.

Geology 
Two fault zones — La Ternera and San Antonio — cut the caldera. Within the caldera several smaller calderas formed, from north to south Caldera Cerro Puquios, Caldera Bellavista, Caldera Agua Nueva, Caldera El Durazno and Caldera Lomas Bayas. The Puquios caldera partly overlaps the Carrizalillo caldera margin. These subsidiary calderas have left lava conduits, lacustrine and intrusive structures and other geomorphologic features. The caldera is constructed in the terrain of the San Antonio formation, which forms megabreccia in the caldera.

Subsidiary calderas 
It contains lithic fragments including monzonite, likely formed from blocks sagging into the caldera.

Eruption history 
The Hornitos basin is the precursor of the caldera, and the Lavas de Sierra La Dichosa form a precaldera stage. During the Cretaceous-Paleocene a group of stratovolcanoes formed in the area. Their eruption products are basalt and trachybasalt containing olivine and pyroxene. Magmatic intrusion triggered the formation of ring faults which then allowed the eruption of pyroclastic flows during caldera collapse. After the collapse, dacitic lava flows in the central sector of the caldera form the first postcollapse volcanism. The Cabeza de Vaca pluton formed within the caldera, using the western caldera rim and the annular fracture. Activity occurred in the Paleocene-Eocene, with the pluton dated 63-59.8 mya. The subsidiary calderas are dated 48-56 mya.

Petrology 
Rhyolitic pyroclastic flows were erupted during the caldera collapse. They contain devitrified fiammes and lack lithic fragments. The lack of fragments and the overall homogeneity indicates that the deposits were placed in short succession. Postcaldera flows are dacites which that are derived from the deeper portions of the magma chamber. Cabeza de Vaca contains granodiorite, granite and monzonite as well as tourmaline breccias containing Cu-Au minerals. The Lomas Bayas-El Durazno mining district is associated with the caldera.

See also 
 Jorquera

References 

Calderas of Chile
Cretaceous calderas
Paleocene calderas